James David Corrothers (July 2, 1869 – February 12, 1917) was an African-American poet, journalist, and minister whom editor Timothy Thomas Fortune called "the coming poet of the race." When Corrothers died, W. E. B. Du Bois eulogized him as "a serious loss to the race and to literature."

Life and career 

Corrothers was born in Cass County, Michigan,and grew up in a small town of anti-slavery activists who settled before the war. He attended Northwestern University in Chicago and Bennett College in Greensboro, North Carolina, but left to work as a newspaper reporter. He met Frederick Douglass at the 1893 World Columbian Exposition.

Corrothers gained early fame with his volume of poetry in "Negro dialect" but later expressed his regret about the volume. He believed that poetry in "standard English" was more appropriate for the twentieth century.

Corrothers shared a long friendship with his contemporary Paul Laurence Dunbar and, after Dunbar's death, memorialized him with the poem "Paul Laurence Dunbar," published in Century Magazine (1912). In his autobiography, In Spite of the Handicap, Corrothers claimed credit for bringing Dunbar's work to the attention of William Dean Howells.

Corrothers worked as a minister after 1898, serving African Methodist Episcopal, Baptist, and Presbyterian congregations. He died of a stroke in West Chester, Pennsylvania, two years after his ministry brought him to a parish there.

In 1922, James Weldon Johnson published seven poems by Corrothers in the anthology The Book of American Negro Poetry (1922).

Works
 The Snapping of the Bow, 1901
 The Black Cat Club, 1902
 At the Closed Gate of Justice, 1913
 In Spite of the Handicap, 1916

References

External links
Errin Jackson, Corrothers, James David (1869-1917), blackpast.org
 

1869 births
1917 deaths
20th-century African-American people
African-American poets
African-American writers
American writers
People from Cass County, Michigan
African Methodist Episcopal Church clergy
African-American Baptist ministers
People from West Chester, Pennsylvania